Coffee Strong was a GI coffeehouse based on the tradition of resistance coffee houses opened during the Vietnam War by antiwar veterans and active duty soldiers in the United States. Based in Lakewood, Washington, it was founded in 2008 by veterans returning from the wars in Afghanistan and Iraq. It was located within 300 meters of the gates at Joint Base Lewis-McChord.

The Coffee Strong advisory board included linguist and dissident Noam Chomsky, Marjorie Cohn, Mike Ferner, Eva Golinger, Dahr Jamail, Antonia Juhasz, Col. Ann Wright (Ret.), and the late historian and author Howard Zinn. In 2011 filmmaker and professor of folklore and English at the University of Oregon Lisa Gilman released the film Grounds for Resistance about Coffee Strong and featured interviews by some of its founders and reactions to it from Joint Base Lewis-McChord soldiers.

See also

 Under the Hood Café
 Iraq Veterans Against the War
 The Shelter Half
 GI Coffeehouses

References

External links

Seattle Times : Weekend Wrap
Official website for the documentary film Grounds for Resistance by Lisa Gilman.
Alternet : How One Coffee Shop in Washington State is Providing a Haven For War Resisters
New era for coffeehouses rooted in anti-war tradition, in Army Times (3/7/10).

Anti–Iraq War groups
GI Coffeehouses
Lakewood, Washington
Joint Base Lewis–McChord
Restaurants established in 2008
2008 establishments in Washington (state)
Restaurants in Washington (state)